Eastern Sociological Society is a non-profit organization with a mission of "promoting excellence in sociological scholarship and instruction". It publishes a peer-reviewed journal (Sociological Forum) and holds a yearly academic conference, the Annual Meeting of Eastern Sociological Society.

External links
Homepage

Sociological organizations
Academic organizations based in the United States
Organizations established in 1930